The 2010 IPP Trophy was a professional tennis tournament played on outdoor clay courts. It was the 23rd edition of the tournament which is part of the 2010 ATP Challenger Tour. It took place in Geneva, Switzerland between 23 and 29 August 2010.

ATP entrants

Seeds

 Rankings are as of August 16, 2010.

Other entrants
The following players received wildcards into the singles main draw:
  Ilya Belyaev
  Adrien Bossel
  Marko Djokovic
  Alexander Sadecky

The following players received entry from the qualifying draw:
  Filip Prpic
  Clément Reix
  Alexandre Renard
  Mathieu Rodrigues

Champions

Singles

 Grigor Dimitrov def.  Pablo Andújar, 6–2, 4–6, 6–4

Doubles

 Gero Kretschmer /  Alex Satschko def.  Philipp Oswald /  Martin Slanar, 6–3, 4–6, [11–9]

External links
Official Site
ITF Search 

IPP Trophy
Geneva Open Challenger